Panagiotis Tsiotras is a professor of aerospace engineering at Georgia Institute of Technology. He has studied variable-speed control moment gyroscopes in connection with flywheel energy storage and has built a spacecraft simulator based on them.

References

Year of birth missing (living people)
Living people
Georgia Tech faculty
Place of birth missing (living people)